Princess Isabella of Denmark, Countess of Monpezat (Isabella Henrietta Ingrid Margrethe; born 21 April 2007) is a member of the Danish royal family. She is the second child and elder daughter of Crown Prince Frederik and Crown Princess Mary.

She is the fourth grandchild and oldest granddaughter of Queen Margrethe II and the late Prince Henrik. She was the first girl born into the Danish royal family since the birth of her great aunt, Queen Anne-Marie of Greece, in 1946. Isabella is third in the line of succession to the Danish throne, after her father and her older brother, Prince Christian.

Biography 

Princess Isabella was born at Rigshospitalet, the Copenhagen University Hospital, in Copenhagen, to Crown Prince Frederik and Crown Princess Mary. At noon on 22 April, a 21-gun salute was fired from the Sixtus Battery at Holmen Naval Base in Copenhagen and from Kronborg Castle in North Zealand to mark her birth.

Her christening took place on 1 July 2007, at the Royal Chapel of Fredensborg Palace where her name, per Danish royal tradition, was revealed to be Isabella Henrietta Ingrid Margrethe, after the Danish queen consort and ancestress Isabella of Austria, the princess's maternal grandmother, paternal great-grandmother, and paternal grandmother respectively. Her godparents were her father's first cousin, Princess Alexia of Greece and Denmark; Queen Mathilde of Belgium (then Duchess of Brabant), Nadine Johnston, Christian Buchwald, Peter Heering and Marie Louise Skeel. Isabella received the Lutheran rite of confirmation in the same chapel on 30 April 2022, which was presided over by Henrik Wigh-Poulsen, the Danish royal Chaplain-in-Ordinary.

Isabella undertook her first official engagement, the baptism of a ferry – the M/F Prinsesse Isabella operating between Jutland and Samsø – named in her honour, on 6 June 2015.

Constitutional position and education 
On 20 December 2007, as he had done the previous year for Prince Christian, Per Stig Møller, Denmark's Minister for Foreign Affairs, formally wrote and signed a hand-written document confirming Isabella's position as third in the line of succession to the Danish throne. The princess's full name, dates of birth and christening, and the names of her godparents were recorded as dictated by the Royal Law of 1799.

On 13 August 2013, Isabella started school at Tranegårdsskolen in Gentofte, the same public school as her older brother. In January 2020, Isabella and her three siblings initiated a 12-week school stay at Lemania-Verbier International School in Verbier, Switzerland. The stay was eventually cut short and the siblings returned home in March due to the intensification of the COVID-19 situation in Denmark. In March 2022, it was announced that Isabella would continue her education at Herlufsholm School starting in August 2022. However, on 26 June 2022, her parents announced in a statement that Isabella would not start Herlufsholm after all due to revelations of recurring problems of bullying, violence and sexual abuse at the school, and in September 2022, she started 9th form at Ingrid Jespersens Gymnasieskole in Copenhagen instead.

Titles and styles

Isabella is styled as Her Royal Highness Princess Isabella of Denmark, Countess of Monpezat. She has been Princess of Denmark since birth and Countess of Monpezat since 29 April 2008, when Queen Margrethe granted the title to her male-line descendants.

References

External links
Official website
New Danish princess named Isabella

Danish princesses
House of Monpezat
Nobility from Copenhagen
2007 births
Living people
Royal children
Countesses of Monpezat
Danish people of Australian descent
Danish people of Scottish descent
Danish people of French descent
Danish people of Belgian descent
Danish Lutherans